Ulisse Dini (14 November 1845 – 28 October 1918) was an Italian mathematician and politician, born in Pisa. He is known for his contribution to real analysis, partly collected in his book "Fondamenti per la teorica delle funzioni di variabili reali".

Life and academic career

Dini attended the Scuola Normale Superiore in order to become a teacher. One of his professors was Enrico Betti. In 1865, a scholarship enabled him to visit Paris, where he studied under Charles Hermite as well as Joseph Bertrand, and published several papers. In 1866, he was appointed to the University of Pisa, where he taught algebra and geodesy. In 1871, he succeeded Betti as professor for analysis and geometry. From 1888 until 1890, Dini was rettore of the Pisa University, and of the Scuola Normale Superiore from 1908 until his death in 1918.

He was also active as a politician: in 1871 he was voted into the Pisa city council, and in 1880, he became a member of the Italian parliament.

Honors
He has been elected honorary member of London Mathematical Society.

Work

Research activity

Dini worked in the field of mathematical analysis during a time when it was begun to be based on rigorous foundations. In addition to his books, he wrote about sixty papers.

He proved the Dini criterion for the convergence of Fourier series and investigated the potential theory and differential geometry of surfaces, based on work by Eugenio Beltrami.

His work on the theory of real functions was also important in the development of the concept of the measure on a set.

The implicit function theorem is known in Italy as the Dini's theorem.

Teaching activity
One of his students was Luigi Bianchi.

Books by U. Dini
Serie di Fourier e altre rappresentazioni analitiche delle funzioni di una variabile reale (Pisa, T. Nistri, 1880)
Lezioni di analisi infinitesimale. vol. 1 (Pisa, T. Nistri, 1907–1915)
Lezioni di analisi infinitesimale.vol. 2 part 1 (Pisa, T. Nistri, 1907–1915)
Lezioni di analisi infinitesimale.vol. 2 part 2 (Pisa, T. Nistri, 1907–1915)
Fondamenti per la teorica delle funzioni di variabili reali (Pisa, T. Nistri, 1878)

See also
 Dini criterion
 Dini derivative
 Dini test
 Dini's theorem
 Dini's surface
 Dini continuity
 Dini–Lipschitz criterion

Notes

References
. "Riemann's conditions for integrability and their influence on the birth of the concept of measure" (English translation of title) is an article on the history of measure theory, analyzing deeply and comprehensively every early contribution to the field, starting from Riemann's work and going to the works of Hermann Hankel, Gaston Darboux, Giulio Ascoli, Henry John Stephen Smith, Ulisse Dini, Vito Volterra, Paul David Gustav du Bois-Reymond and Carl Gustav Axel Harnack.
. Mathematics in the first half of the 20th century (English translation of the title) is a short survey on the development of mathematics in its various branches during the first half of the 20th century.

Further reading
.
.
.

External links

 
 

1845 births
1918 deaths
19th-century Italian mathematicians
20th-century Italian mathematicians
20th-century Italian politicians
Mathematical analysts
People from Pisa
Academic staff of the University of Pisa